The 1985–86 County Championship was the 44th season of the Liga IV, the fourth tier of the Romanian football league system. The champions of each county association play against one from a neighboring county in a play-off  to gain promotion to Divizia C.

Promotion play-off 
Teams promoted to Divizia C without a play-off matches as teams from less represented counties in the third division.

 (BT) Metalul Botoșani
 (SJ) Silvania Cehu Silvanlei
 (GL) Gloria Galați
 (VL) Lotru Brezoi

 (VN) Energia Focșani
 (IS) Tepro Iași
 (GR) Petrolul Roata de Jos

 Ilfov County did not enter a team in the play-offs.

The matches was played on 6 and 13 July 1986.

County leagues

Hunedoara County

Maramureș County 
Championship final 
The championship final was played on 18 June 1986 at 23 August Stadium in Baia Mare.

Minerul Baia Borșa won the Maramureș County Championship and qualify to promotion play-off in Divizia C.

Neamț County

See also 
 1985–86 Divizia A
 1985–86 Divizia B
 1985–86 Cupa României

References

External links
 

Liga IV seasons
4
Romania